OOAworld is a website dedicated to original, creative and qualitative multimedia storytelling. All content is produced by Jean Yves Chainon  (including creative writing, photography and videos) and his partner, Carole Chainon, who writes and edits the travel section, entitled Rolling Coconut.

Jean Yves Chainon writes under the pen name ‘Ooa Revo’ and Carole Chainon writes under the pen name ‘Rolling Coconut’.

OOAworld was relaunched in 2015. Initially the website was called OOAmerica and was inspired by Jean Yves Chainon's 2011-2012 road trips driving across the United States of America.  His work has been featured in a variety of news media including the Washington Post, Observdor  and MSN.

One of OOAworld's main background projects is a film and documentary series featuring interviews of the very different people met around the world, asking them to share their stories and answer one common question: “What’s your philosophy of life?”

Other projects include photo series and photo books, animation, time-lapse photography and short films. Jean Yves Chainon and Carole Chainon are also the founders of virtual reality and 360 video production studio JYC VR, which produces content for media organization and brands and is based in Los Angeles with a presence in Paris and London.

References

American entertainment websites